Garden of the Titans: Live at Red Rocks Amphitheater is a live album and concert video by Swedish progressive metal band Opeth, released on 2 November 2018 via Nuclear Blast. It was recorded on 11 May 2017 at Red Rocks Amphitheatre in Morrison, Colorado, United States, as the band was touring the United States in support of their album Sorceress.

Track listing
All songs by Mikael Åkerfeldt except "Demon of the Fall" by Åkerfeldt and Peter Lindgren.

Charts

References

Opeth albums
2018 live albums